The 2004–05 season saw Futbol Club Barcelona end their six-year wait for the La Liga title, having not won the league or, indeed, any trophy since the 1998–99 season and thus La Liga trophy returned to Barcelona's trophy room. Having finished second in La Liga the previous season, Barcelona once again competed in the UEFA Champions League as well as the Copa del Rey. The squad was restructured significantly following the retirement of key players Luis Enrique and Marc Overmars, as well as the return of Edgar Davids to Juventus and first team regulars Patrick Kluivert and Phillip Cocu moving onto new clubs. Ronaldinho's and new signing Samuel Eto'o's performances won them places in FIFPro's XI of 2004–05. Ronaldinho was later named FIFA World Player of the Year for 2005 for the second time in succession and with the highest points total ever; Eto'o came third. This season was also notable for the debut of Lionel Messi.

Players

Squad
Correct as of 30 September 2009.

In

Total spending:   €74.2 million

Out

Total income:   €14.75 million
{|

Competitions

La Liga

League table

Results by Round

Matches

Copa del Rey

Round of 64

Champions League

Group stage

First knockout round

Statistics

Players statistics

See also
FC Barcelona
2004–05 UEFA Champions League
2004–05 La Liga
2004–05 Copa del Rey

References

External links
 
 FCBarcelonaweb.co.uk English Speaking FC Barcelona Supporters
 ESPNsoccernet: Barcelona Team Page 
 FC Barcelona (Spain) profile
 uefa.com - UEFA Champions League 
 Web Oficial de la Liga de Fútbol Profesional
 
 

FC Barcelona seasons
Barcelona
Spanish football championship-winning seasons